Emily Shaw can refer to:

People

 Emily Alice Shaw, Canadian luthier
 Emily Shaw, actress from The Restaurant
 Emily Agnes, British model (birth name Emily Shaw)
 English athlete
 Wife of Edward Percival Wright
 Emily Shaw, American soccer player

Fictional characters

 A character from Doctor Who.
 A character from Lady Jayne: Killer.